Jonathan Tinhan (born 1 June 1989) is a French former professional footballer who played as a striker.

Career
Born in Échirolles and of Beninese descent, Tinhan made his professional Ligue 1 debut on 16 August 2009 for Grenoble in a Ligue 1 game against Boulogne.

In 2011, he moved to Montpellier, signing a four-year deal.

Ahead of the 2019–20 season Tinhan returned to Grenoble. In April 2020, with his contract running out at the end of the season, Tinhan announced his retirement from playing professionally.

References

External links
 

1989 births
Living people
People from Échirolles
Sportspeople from Isère
French sportspeople of Beninese descent
French footballers
Footballers from Auvergne-Rhône-Alpes
Association football midfielders
Grenoble Foot 38 players
Montpellier HSC players
AC Arlésien players
FC Istres players
Red Star F.C. players
Amiens SC players
ES Troyes AC players
Ligue 1 players
Ligue 2 players
Championnat National players
Black French sportspeople